The NATO Day is a day commemorating the founding of NATO by the signing of the North Atlantic Treaty on 4 April 1949. It is celebrated in all Allied countries, including, but not limited to, North Macedonia and marked on the first Sunday of April in Romania (where the holiday is known as ). However, in Lithuania it is celebrated on 29 March, in honor of its accession to NATO in 2004.

References

Day
Public holidays in Romania